Boneh-ye Ajam (also Romanized as Boneh-ye ‘Ajam; also known as Bon ‘Ajam) is a village in Gazin Rural District, Raghiveh District, Haftgel County, Khuzestan Province, Iran. At the 2006 census, its population was 131, in 26 families.

References 

Populated places in Haftkel County